Hellinsia paramoi is a moth of the family Pterophoridae. It is found in Brazil and Venezuela.

The forewings are bone coloured. Adults are on wing in March and September.

References

Moths described in 2001
paramoi
Pterophoridae of South America